Hypena laceratalis, the lantana defoliator, is a moth of the family Erebidae. It was first described by Francis Walker in 1859. It is native to Africa (where it is known from Kenya, Socotra, Madagascar, Mascarenes) to Yemen, India and Myanmar but was deliberately introduced to Australia (where it now known from northern Queensland to Kempsey in New South Wales) via Hawaii in 1965 to control the weed Lantana camara.

The larvae feed on Lantana camara. They feed on the undersides of leaves, forming clear windows and skeletonising the leaves. Pupation occurs in the soil.

Development from egg to adult takes about 28 days. Adults live for about two weeks.

References
 Distribution: from Papillons de la Réunion: 388.

External links

Biological control species factsheet

laceratalis
Owlet moths of Africa
Moths of Asia
Moths described in 1859
Fauna of Socotra